Fingal Bay is the easternmost suburb of the Port Stephens local government area in the Hunter Region of New South Wales, Australia. The only population centre is the township of the same name, which itself is named after the adjacent, small, semi-circular bay. At the 2021 census, the population of the town was 1,635.

Except for the township, most of Fingal Bay is included in the Tomaree National Park, which includes forested areas, coastal scrubland, beaches and most of the Fingal headland. The suburb does not include the bay itself.

Fingal Bay 
Waters to the northeast of the spit are known as "Fly Roads". Crossing between the mainland and the headland along the spit is considered dangerous. According to a sign on the beach, people have died crossing the spit, which is covered by breaking waves at high tide. The south-western head of the bay is Fingal Head, which is located southeast of the town.

History 
The bay was originally known as "False Bay", because it could be mistaken for the entrance to Port Stephens. The name "Fingal Bay" appeared on an 1845 map prepared by Captain Phillip Parker King.

Heritage listings 
Fingal Bay has a number of heritage-listed sites, including Point Stephens Light on Shark Island.

Tourism campaign 
Fingal Spit was a location for the 2006 "So where the bloody hell are you?" advertising campaign filmed for Tourism Australia and appears at the end of the advertisement.

Headland and Point Stephens 
Point Stephens was connected to the mainland prior to the "Maitland gale" in 1891. The southeasternmost point of the headland was named "Point Stephens" by Captain Cook when he passed on 11 May 1770, honouring Sir Philip Stephens who was Secretary to the Admiralty. Stephens was a personal friend of Cook and had recommended him for command of the voyage. It seems Cook's initial choice had actually been Point Keppel (named after Augustus Keppel, a Lords Commissioner of the Admiralty), but instead he used Keppel later when he named Keppel Bay. The name first appeared on chart 1070, prepared by Captain Phillip Parker King in 1845.

Lighthouse 

As early as 1857, the need for a lighthouse on Point Stephens was identified, due to the proximity to the entrance of Port Stephens, and the dangers of the local coastline to ships. In 1973 the lighthouse keeper was replaced by automaded system powered by solar.

Transport
Port Stephens Coaches operate local services to Newcastle as well as an express service to Sydney.

Notes

References

External links 

 Coastal Explorer Pacific Touring Route Sydney to Brisbane, Cartoscope, 4th edition, 2004

Bays of New South Wales
Headlands of New South Wales
Suburbs of Port Stephens Council
Towns in the Hunter Region
Beaches of New South Wales